The Sabattus River is an  tributary of the Androscoggin River in Maine. Via the Androscoggin River, water from the Sabattus River flows to the Kennebec River at Merrymeeting Bay and ultimately to the Atlantic Ocean.

Sabattus Pond

Sabattus Pond is the largest lake on the Sabattus River. The pond extends northward from a dam in the northwest corner of Sabattus along the town line between Greene to the west and Wales to the east. The Androscoggin Railroad was built along the east shore of the pond in 1861. The abandoned railroad grade has subsequently been developed with shoreline residences and seasonal cabins west of Maine State Route 132. Poor water quality from extensive shoreline development has eliminated historic populations of rainbow smelt and smallmouth bass. Remaining angling opportunities for chain pickerel and white perch have been augmented by introducing largemouth bass. Northern Pike is the main fishery with an annual ice fishing Pike derby that have had specimens over 40 inches and 20 pounds being reported.

See also
List of rivers of Maine

References

Maine Streamflow Data from the USGS
Maine Watershed Data From Environmental Protection Agency

Tributaries of the Kennebec River
Rivers of Maine
Rivers of Androscoggin County, Maine
https://www.ohpikederby.com/